Hello, Privilege. It's Me, Chelsea is a 2019 documentary directed by Alex Stapleton and starring Chelsea Handler. The premise revolves around examining the concept of white privilege. The film was released on September 13, 2019 on Netflix.

Cast
 Chelsea Handler
 Kevin Hart
 Tiffany Haddish
 W. Kamau Bell
 Tim Wise
 Ruby Sales
 Rashad Robinson
 Carol Anderson

References

External links
 
 
 

2019 documentary films
2019 films
Netflix original documentary films
Documentary films about racism in the United States
Works about White Americans
Films about race and ethnicity
American documentary television films
White privilege
2010s English-language films
2010s American films